Dalun is a town of the county-level city of Beiliu, Yulin in southeast Guangxi, China, bordering Guangdong province to the east. , it has one residential community, 9 villages and one farm community under its administration.

See also 
 List of township-level divisions of Guangxi

References 

Beiliu
Towns of Guangxi